"Gentle on My Mind" is a 1967 song written by John Hartford and covered by Glen Campbell, Elvis Presley and many others.

Gentle on My Mind may also refer to:
 Gentle on My Mind (1967 Glen Campbell album)
 Gentle on My Mind (1972 Glen Campbell album)
 Gentle on My Mind (Patti Page album), 1968
 Gentle on My Mind (Dean Martin album), 1968